A Barnstormer in Oz: A Rationalization and Extrapolation of the Split-Level Continuum is a 1982 novel by Philip José Farmer and is based on the setting and characters of L. Frank Baum's The Wonderful Wizard of Oz.

The central character of the novel is Hank Stover, a pilot and the son of Dorothy Gale, who finds himself in Oz when his plane gets lost in a green cloud over Kansas in 1923. The Oz he discovers is on the brink of civil war; he encounters Erakna, the new Wicked Witch.

Farmer takes an unusual approach to the corpus of Oz literature; he depends almost solely on Baum's original Oz book and neglects its many sequels. This "originalist" approach to the Oz mythos is rare but not unique; a few other writers have taken similar tacks, including  Roger S. Baum, the great-grandson of L. Frank Baum. In Barnstormer, Dorothy has made only one visit to Oz; when Hank Stover arrives, the Scarecrow still rules the Emerald City, just as at the end of Baum's first Oz book.

Since Farmer wrote for adults rather than children, there are elements of sex and violence in Barnstormer that are not typical of the Oz literature. As the book's subtitle indicates, Farmer indulges a rationalizing and explanatory bent: he treats Oz as a parallel universe in the science fiction vein. He attempts explanations and analyses of some of the fantastic elements in Baum's fictional world, including magic and talking animals. Literary scholars Kent Drummond, Susan Aronstein, and Terri L. Rittenburg have called it "the first instance of Dark Oz" and "the beginning of stand-alone, full-blown literary re-consumptions of Oz", specifying that it introduced the concept of "revisionist Oz, an Oz that purports to offer consumers the 'real Oz', the truth behind the myth."

Opinions of Farmer's contribution to the literature of Oz span the entire critical spectrum; Jack Zipes called the novel "splendid", while Baum biographer Katharine Rogers considered it "revision to the point of debasement." Publishers Weekly considered it to be "done with almost no whimsy or humor" and "though ambitious, (...) not one of [Farmer's] better books;" In Analog Science Fiction and Fact, Thomas Easton opined that the novel "will surely appeal best to those who remember Oz fondly. Others may well find it a touch too cute."

References

1982 American novels
1982 fantasy novels
Novels by Philip José Farmer
Oz (franchise) books
Aviation novels
Parallel literature
Books with cover art by Don Ivan Punchatz
Phantasia Press books